Vincent van der Voort (born 18 December 1975) is a Dutch professional darts player on the PDC circuit. As of the 2012 PDC World Darts Championship, his nickname is the "Dutch Destroyer", although he used to go by "Grease Lightning". He is best known for his quick throwing style, which is how he got his temporary nickname "The Fastest Player in the World". He reached the final of the 2007 UK Open, which helped him become a well known face in the world of darts.

Playing style
Van der Voort is well known for his spasmodic style and machine-gun speed of play which has gained him a reputation in both the BDO and the PDC for being one of the more erratic throwers in the darting world. This ties in with his old entrance music, "Fast Fuse" by English band Kasabian. This has resulted in him tending to be either right on or way off his intended target.

BDO career
His best results in British Darts Organisation events were winning the Danish Open in 2002 and 2006 and reaching the quarter finals of the BDO World Championship at Frimley Green in 2005, defeating 2004 champion Andy Fordham in the process.

He suffered a first round exit in the 2007 World Championship to unranked qualifier Davy Richardson. It was announced days later that Van der Voort, along with fellow Dutchmen Jelle Klaasen and Michael van Gerwen would be switching to the Professional Darts Corporation (PDC).

PDC career

Van der Voort produced a superb run to reach the final of the 2007 UK Open before losing in the final to countryman Raymond van Barneveld. The runner-up prize of £15,000 helped him climb up the world rankings having started placed 211 in the PDC and has now made it into the top 20. He qualified for the 2007 Las Vegas Desert Classic but lost in the first round to Peter Manley.

2008
Van der Voort reached the second round of the 2008 PDC World Championship. He played his fellow Dutchman Klaasen in the first round, defeating him 3–2 in sets. Adrian Lewis was his opponent in the second round and Van der Voort lost 2–4. The US Open saw a disappointing 2–3 first round defeat at the hands of John Kuczynski of the US.

The UK Open saw a return to form with Van der Voort making it all the way to the semi-final. He started in the fourth round with a fine 9–4 win over Colin Lloyd. This was followed up in the fifth round with another victory over Klaasen. The quarter final matched him with Chris Thompson and a 10–5 win was enough to see Van der Voort through to the semi-final. In the semi-final, Van der Voort eventually succumbed to a 10–4 defeat by James Wade who went on to win the tournament.

His World Matchplay campaign was ended at the first hurdle. Number 13 seed Alan Tabern won the encounter with a narrow 10–8 victory. The World Grand Prix saw Van der Voort playing former World number 1 Lloyd in the first round and Van der Voort eliminated by a score of 0–2.

Van der Voort won group 6 of the inaugural Championship League with a 7–2 thrashing over Mark Walsh to qualify for the Winners group. He would go on to finish bottom of the group, with only one win from his seven matches.

2009
Van der Voort reached the third round of the 2009 PDC World Championship. He defeated Hungary's Nándor Bezzeg 3–0 in sets and then defeated number 14 seed Colin Osborne in the second round 4–1 assisted by some superb finishes. He eventually went out to number 3 seed Wade losing 4–0 in the last 16. His results moved him to the brink of the top sixteen, ranking in 17th and having passed Roland Scholten on the PDC Order of Merit, Van der Voort was the second-highest ranked Dutchman in the rankings, behind Van Barneveld.

At the 2009 Grand Slam of Darts, Van der Voort suffered a defeat to Anastasia Dobromyslova in the group stages, becoming only the second man in history to lose a televised match to a woman. Two days later, however, he sensationally thrashed defending champion Phil Taylor 5–1, becoming only the third man in 2009 to beat Taylor in a televised match (the others being Mervyn King and James Wade).

2010
On 30 December 2010, Van der Voort's biggest win occurred in the round of 16 of the 2011 PDC World Darts Championship where he eliminated the 2010 runner-up and number four seed Simon Whitlock 4–2.
However, in the quarter-finals on 1 January 2011, Van der Voort then lost 2–5 against Adrian Lewis.

2011
He reached the final in the first of the 2011 players championships in Germany, where he lost 6–1 to Mervyn King. He went on to win his first title of 2011, winning a UK Open Qualifier against Raymond Van Barneveld in a high scoring match.

2012
Van der Voort beat Mark Hylton 3–2 in the first round of the 2012 World Championship in a thrilling match. His second round tie also went to a deciding set against Andy Hamilton, but this time the Dutchman was on the wrong end and exited the tournament by 3 sets to 4.
He then represented the Netherlands in the 2012 PDC World Cup of Darts to try to defend the title won by Raymond van Barneveld and Co Stompé in 2010. Van der Voort and Van Barneveld enjoyed comfortable victories over Austria and Northern Ireland to set up a semi-final clash with the Australian pair of Paul Nicholson and Simon Whitlock. Van Barneveld beat Nicholson 4–0 in their singles match, but this was the only point the Dutch won as they relinquished their crown in a 1–5 defeat. Van der Voort lost 7–9 in the last 32 of the UK Open to Kim Huybrechts, and at the World Matchplay he was defeated by Ian White 5–10 in the first round. He later revealed he had passed out before the match and returned home to Holland to undergo tests which revealed him to be lactose intolerant. Doctors advised him to miss the rest of 2012, however Van der Voort defied them to beat William O'Connor in the first round of the World Grand Prix in October. He then lost to Brendan Dolan 1–3 in sets in the last 16. After all 33 ProTour events of 2012 had been played, Van der Voort was 24th on the Order of Merit, inside the top 32 who qualified for the Players Championship Finals. He was beaten by Kim Huybrechts 3–6 in the first round.

2013
Van der Voort won his first round match at the World Championship 3–0 over former World Masters runner-up Stuart Kellett and then overcame Dean Winstanley 4–2, despite his opponent hitting a nine-dart finish in the third set. He then outscored James Wade in the last 16, but missed too many doubles including ones to win the second and third set and was beaten 0–4. He lost 5–3 in the first round of the UK Open to Kirk Shepherd and finished bottom of Group D at the Grand Slam of Darts having won one of his three games. Van der Voort reached the last 16 stage of four ProTour events during 2013 but lost on each occasion.

2014
He was involved in a high quality match against Adrian Lewis in the second round of the 2014 World Championship as Van der Voort averaged 99.47, but lost 4–1. He missed match darts in three successive legs against compatriot Christian Kist in the fourth round of the UK Open to be eliminated 9–8. In June, Van der Voort won the Austrian Darts Open by beating Jamie Caven 6–5. He was 5–2 down in the final, but took two successive legs and then levelled the match by taking out a 136 finish with Caven waiting on 80. In the deciding leg he was first to a finish, and he took out 83 on double 8 with a pressure last dart with Caven waiting on 56. It was Van der Voort's first title in three years. He lost in the first round of the World Matchplay and World Grand Prix 10–4 to Raymond van Barneveld and 2–0 (sets) to Michael van Gerwen respectively. Van der Voort recorded a 6–4 win against Simon Whitlock at the European Championship, before Van Barneveld knocked him out 10–7. He averaged 104.86 in whitewashing Andy Hamilton 6–0 in the opening round of the Players Championship Finals and then eliminated Peter Wright 10–5 and Dean Winstanley 10–8, after recovering from a 3–0 deficit, to reach his first major semi-final since 2008. He fell 10–3 down to Gary Anderson and, despite a rally to win four successive legs, was beaten 11–7. In the first round of the World Championship 2015 he beat the Scottish player John Henderson.

2015
Van der Voort took out a crucial 157 finish in the deciding set of his first round match at the 2015 World Championship, with his opponent John Henderson waiting on 80 to eliminate him. Van der Voort then won two 14 dart legs to beat him 3–2, before whitewashing teenager Max Hopp 4–0 and seeing off Dean Winstanley 4–2. Van der Voort came back from 2–0 down in the quarter-finals against Phil Taylor to lead 3–2. Taylor missed a multitude of set darts in the deciding leg of the next, but Van der Voort was unable to set up a shot at a double with six darts from 156 as Taylor levelled at 3–3. The final two sets both went to Taylor as he won 5–3. Van der Voort progressed through to the final of the second UK Open Qualifier, where he lost 6–1 to Michael van Gerwen. Despite averaging 101.03 in the fifth round of the UK Open, it was still over 10 points lower than Taylor's average, as Van der Voort was eliminated 9–3.

Van der Voort gained some revenge over Taylor in the first round of the World Grand Prix by defeating him 2–0 in sets in the first round and then beat Terry Jenkins 3–0 to reach the quarter-finals for the first time. He led Mensur Suljović 1–0, but missed 11 darts to win the next set which changed the whole match as he then lost nine consecutive legs to be knocked out 3–1. He lost in the first round of the European Championship 6–1 to Phil Taylor and 10–6 to Michael van Gerwen in the second round of the Players Championship Finals. 2015 did mark the first time that Van der Voort had reached two major quarter-finals in the same year.

2016
Van der Voort beat Laurence Ryder 3–0 in the first round of the 2016 World Championship and then came back from 2–0 down against Kyle Anderson to win 4–2. However, he could only win one leg against Gary Anderson in a 4–0 third round defeat. He had a high quality match with Phil Taylor in the fifth round of the UK Open as both players averaged over 100, but Van der Voort lost 9–7. He reached the semi-finals of the sixth Players Championship event and was defeated 6–4 by James Wade. This would prove to be Van der Voort's only last four appearance of 2016. His year tailed off after that as he was eliminated in the first round of the World Matchplay, failed to qualify for the World Grand Prix, European Championship and Grand Slam and lost in the second round of the Players Championship Finals.

2017
Van der Voort was beaten 3–1 by Max Hopp in the first round of the World Championship, and then suggested he might retire from darts due to a back injury that has been plaguing his performances in recent years.

2018
Van der Voort was beaten by Raymond van Barneveld in the third Round of the 2018 PDC World Darts Championship 4–1.

2019
He reached the third round of the World Championship again by beating Lourence Ilagan and Darren Webster before losing to Chris Dobey 3-4. His consistent results on the 2019 tour allowed him a spot at the 2019 World Matchplay, qualifying for Blackpool again after three years.

World Championship results

BDO
2002: First round (lost to Mensur Suljović 2–3)
2003: Second round (lost to Tony David 1–3)
2004: First round (lost to Stephen Bunting 2–3)
2005: Quarter-finals (lost to Raymond van Barneveld 0–5)
2006: Second round (lost to Tony O'Shea 0–4)
2007: First round (lost to Davy Richardson 1–3)

PDC
2008: Second round (lost to Adrian Lewis 2–4)
2009: Third round (lost to James Wade 0–4)
2010: Second round (lost to Kevin Painter 3–4)
2011: Quarter-finals (lost to Adrian Lewis 2–5)
2012: Second round (lost to Andy Hamilton 3–4)
2013: Third round (lost to James Wade 0–4)
2014: Second round (lost to Adrian Lewis 1–4)
2015: Quarter-finals (lost to Phil Taylor 3–5)
2016: Third round (lost to Gary Anderson 0–4)
2017: First round (lost to Max Hopp 1–3)
2018: Third round (lost to Raymond van Barneveld 1–4)
2019: Third round (lost to Chris Dobey 3–4)
2020: Second round (lost to Dave Chisnall 1–3)
2021: Fourth round (lost to Daryl Gurney 2–4)
2022: Third round (withdrew – COVID-19)
2023: Third round (lost to Luke Humphries 3–4)

Career finals

PDC major finals: 1 (1 runner-up)

Performance timeline

BDO

PDC

PDC European Tour

References

External links
Official website

Management website

1975 births
Living people
Dutch darts players
Dutch sports announcers
People from Purmerend
Professional Darts Corporation current tour card holders
British Darts Organisation players
PDC ranking title winners
PDC World Cup of Darts Dutch team
Sportspeople from North Holland